The Marriage Playground is a 1929 American pre-Code drama film directed by Lothar Mendes, and written by Doris Anderson, J. Walter Ruben, and Edith Wharton. The film stars Mary Brian, Fredric March, Lilyan Tashman, Huntley Gordon, Kay Francis, William Austin, and Seena Owen. The film was released on December 21, 1929, by Paramount Pictures.

Cast
Mary Brian	as Judith Wheater
Fredric March as Martin Boyne
Lilyan Tashman as Joyce Wheater
Huntley Gordon as Cliff Wheater
Kay Francis as Lady Wrench
William Austin as Lord Wrench
Seena Owen as Rose Sellers
Philippe De Lacy as Terry Wheater
Anita Louise as Blanca Wheater
Mitzi Green as Zinnie Wheater
Billy Seay as Bun Wheater
Ruby Parsley as Beatrice Wheater
Donald Smith as Chip Wheater
Jocelyn Lee as Sybil
Maude Turner Gordon as Aunt Julia Langley
Armand Kaliz as Prince Matriano
Joan Standing as Miss Scopey
Gordon De Main as Mr. Delafield

See also
The Children (1990)

References

External links
 
 
Springtime Fashions: The Marriage Playground (1929) at prettycleverfilms.com (film stills)

1929 films
1920s English-language films
1929 drama films
Paramount Pictures films
Films based on works by Edith Wharton
Films directed by Lothar Mendes
American black-and-white films
1920s American films